The 2002–03 Hellenic Football League season was the 50th in the history of the Hellenic Football League, a football competition in England.

Premier Division

The Premier Division featured 19 clubs which competed in the division last season, along with two new clubs, promoted from Division One West:
Hook Norton
Pewsey Vale

League table

Division One East

Division One East featured 16 clubs which competed in the division last season, along with two clubs:
Holyport, joined from the Hayes & Giles League
Letcombe, transferred from Division One West

League table

Division One West

Division One West featured 14 clubs which competed in the division last season, along with six new clubs:
Adderbury Park
Cheltenham Saracens, relegated from the Premier Division
Harrow Hill, relegated from the Premier Division
New College Academy, new club
Slimbridge, joined from the Gloucestershire County League
Witney United, new club

League table

References

External links
 Hellenic Football League

2002-03
8